is the fifth indie single by Japanese girl group Melon Kinenbi, in a collaboration with Going Under Ground. It was released as limited distribution on 30 December 2009. People who purchased the single from the Tower Records online store received a free original computer wallpaper.

Track listing

References

 

2009 singles
2009 songs